Baissomantidae is an extinct family of primitive mantises known from the Cretaceous period. There are two known genera, Baissomantis, known from the Early Cretaceous Zaza Formation of Buryatia, Russia, and Labradormantis from the mid Cretaceous (Cenomanian) Redmond Formation of Labrador, Canada. They are amongst the most primitive mantises known, only more advanced than Santanmantis.

References 

Prehistoric insect families
†